Pasvalys District Municipality is one of 60 municipalities in Lithuania.

Structure
District structure:   
 2 cities – Joniškėlis and Pasvalys;
 7 towns – Daujėnai, Krikliniai, Krinčinas, Pumpėnai, Pušalotas, Saločiai and Vaškai;
 398 villages.
  
Population of largest elderships of Pasvalys District Municipality (2001): 
 Pasvalys – 8709
 Joniškėlis – 1477
 Pumpėnai – 952
 Saločiai – 913
 Pušalotas – 885
 Vaškai – 688
 Mikoliškis – 617
 Ustukiai – 615
 Narteikiai – 603
 Pajiešmeniai – 603

References

 
Municipalities of Panevėžys County
Municipalities of Lithuania